DealCenter is a social media platform and online meeting management system used at trade shows and events for arranging face-to-face meetings.  DealCenter, LLC was established January 2008 though the online meeting planner has been designed and in use by Jaymie Scotto & Associates as an event planning product since 2005, pre-dating today's social networking communities.  The DealCenter platform is an easy and user-friendly way to see who else is attending or exhibiting an event, to search the list of attendees by relevant information (such as company name, product offering or area served etc.) and then to create one-on-one meetings that will be held on-site at the event.  The DealCenter system is traditionally rolled out months before the show date, so attendees can pre-plan their meetings and attend the event with a scheduled timetable of targeted prospect, customer or partner meetings.

To utilize the platform, attendees and exhibitors log on to the customized event website and are able to see the profiles of other participants who will be attending the event. The DealCenter manages the meeting schedules, accepts or declines invitations and allows users to send secure messages via the DealCenter to further expand the business opportunity pipeline. All the planning is done through the platform interface, enabling users to arrive with a roster of meetings already scheduled and confirmed. No contact information is shared or released unless the user voluntarily provides it. The confirmed meetings are assigned a table number and held on-site in a designated area, including, if desired, meeting rooms, bilateral tables, exhibit booths and/or a DealCenter Area. 
The DealCenter Concierge Service is a new development within the DealCenter technology. The Concierge Service automatically schedules meetings on a user's behalf based on the information provided when creating a profile.

Milestones
January 2011 – Jaymie Scotto & Associates launches the DealCenter online meeting system for its February 2011 Telecom One-on-One Power Networking Event 
September 2010 – IAEE Selects DealCenter LLC's meeting management system for Expo! Expo! IAEE's Annual meeting & Exhibition in 2010 
August 2010 - AFCOM Selects DealCenter LLC's meeting management system for the Upcoming Data Center World Fall 2010
March 2010 – Telx Technologies Taps DealCenter, LLC for its Online Meeting System for its Annual Networking Event, the Telx Customer Business Exchange (CBX) 2010
September 2009 – cnX3 and DealCenter, LLC announce they will partner again to offer cnX3 DealCenter
May 2009 - DealCenter to provide social media platform and Online Meeting System for the 2009 HCEA Annual Meeting
March 2009 - TMC Dark Fiber Community DealCenter launched

References

Sources

External links
 

[www.internationaltelecomsweek.com]

Business software